Longueau British Cemetery is a First World War cemetery of Commonwealth soldiers in France, located to the east of Longueau, a suburb south-east of Amiens, Somme, France. The cemetery was begun in April 1918 and contains 204 burials, 14 of which are unidentified. Two Second World War airmen are also interred in the cemetery.

History
The cemetery was created in April 1918, as the British defensive lines before Amiens were re-established to contain a German push. Interments were taken until the end of August 1918 and later interments were made as field graves were moved to the cemetery. The cemetery was designed by Sir Reginald Blomfield.

References

External links
 

Cemeteries in Somme (department)
Commonwealth War Graves Commission cemeteries in France
World War I cemeteries in France
World War II cemeteries in France